Eric Andre Allen (born November 22, 1965) is an American football coach and former cornerback who played in the National Football League (NFL) for the Philadelphia Eagles, New Orleans Saints, and Oakland Raiders from 1988 to 2001.  A six-time Pro Bowl selection, Allen retired from football after the 2001 season and is currently an NFL analyst for Pac-12 Networks.  In his NFL career, he recorded 54 interceptions for 827 yards and eight touchdowns, while also recovering seven fumbles.  His 54 interceptions ties him for 21st in NFL history. He now lives in San Diego, California with his wife Lynn Allen, with whom he has four children.

In 2019, he served as the defensive backs coach for the San Diego Fleet of the Alliance of American Football (AAF).

Early years
Allen played high school football at Point Loma High School under legendary coach Bennie Edens.

College career
Allen played college football at Arizona State University.

Professional career
Allen was drafted by the Philadelphia Eagles in the second round of the 1988 NFL Draft.

Allen played seven seasons for the Eagles, three seasons for the New Orleans Saints, and four seasons for the Oakland Raiders. While with the Eagles he was a very popular player with the "Gang Green" Defense, playing with NFL greats Reggie White, Seth Joyner, Jerome Brown, Clyde Simmons, Andre Waters, Mike Pitts, and Wes Hopkins. He is the only NFL player to run back three or more interceptions for scores in two separate seasons.

One of Allen's most memorable plays occurred October 3, 1993, in a game against the New York Jets. Having lost their starting quarterback (Randall Cunningham) to a fractured fibula early in the contest, the Eagles found themselves trailing the Jets by two points late in the 4th quarter as the Jets drove downfield for what would likely be the game's final points. Jets quarterback Boomer Esiason attempted to throw for a first down inside the Eagles 10-yard line as Allen stepped in front of the intended receiver at the 6-yard line. The ensuing 94-yard touchdown return was declared "Greatest Interception Return in NFL History" by Steve Sabol of NFL Films.

After several successful and injury-free seasons at Philadelphia and New Orleans, Allen blew out his knee during the 1998 season on November 15 while playing for the Oakland Raiders against the Seattle Seahawks and missed the rest of that season.  But he came back strong in 2000 and had a season to remember, with six interceptions, including a team-record three for touchdowns.  His teammates honored him with the first annual Eric Turner award for the Raiders' most outstanding defensive player.  The award was created in the memory of the Oakland free safety who died of abdominal cancer in May 2000.

Through the 2001 season, Allen played in 214 of a possible 217 games.

In 2009, Allen also was inducted by the San Diego Hall of Champions into the Breitbard Hall of Fame honoring San Diego's finest athletes both on and off the playing surface.

Television career
Allen joined ESPN in August 2002 as an NFL studio analyst. Allen primarily appears on ESPN's "Sportscenter" as an NFL analyst.

Allen has had appearances as a college football analyst on the Pac-12 Networks football shows, as well as for the station's flagship show "Sports Report" as a football analyst.

Coaching career
On December 19, 2018, Allen was named defensive backs coach for the San Diego Fleet of the Alliance of American Football.

References

External links
 

1965 births
Living people
American football cornerbacks
Arizona State Sun Devils football players
Philadelphia Eagles players
New Orleans Saints players
Oakland Raiders players
National Football League announcers
National Conference Pro Bowl players
Point Loma High School alumni
Players of American football from San Diego
San Diego Fleet coaches
Ed Block Courage Award recipients